The Philippine Collegiate Champions League (PCCL) is a national collegiate basketball championship league in the Philippines. Its tournament, known as the "National Collegiate Championship" (NCC) is sanctioned by the Samahang Basketbol ng Pilipinas, the country's national basketball federation. The league's format varies every season with 250 teams coming from nine different regional areas nationwide.

History
It was originally established in 2002 as the Collegiate Champions League (CCL). Reynaldo Gamboa, former Philippine Basketball Association (PBA) chairman and team governor for the Shell Turbo Chargers was named as the chairman of the tournament, while former national coach Joe Lipa served as the tournament director and commissioner. In 2008, the national governing body of basketball in the Philippines, the Samahang Basketbol ng Pilipinas (SBP) sanctioned the CCL and was renamed into the Philippine Collegiate Champions League in which the organizers of the old CCL were retained.

Teams from the UAAP had dominated the tournament, winning ten (10) out of the twelve (12) championships contested, with the remainder being won by teams from the NCAA. UAAP and NCAA teams are given four, and the CESAFI one, outright slots in the round of 16 berths. No UAAP champion vs. NCAA champion meeting took place in the finals, although a finals between the UAAP champion and the NCAA runner-up was contested in 2003 (FEU vs. San Sebastian), 2011 (Ateneo vs. San Sebastian)and 2019 (Ateneo vs. San Beda), UAAP and CESAFI champions contested the finals in 2018, and both finalists in the UAAP contested the 2008 and 2012 championship while NCAA finalists would later contested in 2018.

In 2002, 2003, 2009, 2010, 2012, 2013 and 2014, the Finals were played in a best-of-3 series; the others were one-off games (2004-2008); no third-place game was held on the first two tournaments. The contest was not held in 2005. In 2011, the single round robin Final Four match-up was introduced with the team with the most wins will have a twice-to-beat incentive in the Finals. However, in 2012, it was changed to whichever team to first get two (2) wins will automatically advanced to the Finals with the Finals without any incentives and with the Finals being played in a best-of-three series.

Due to time constraints, the championship of the 2015 tournament was cancelled. Instead, the winners of the semifinal round were declared as co-champions.

There was no tournament held in 2016 due to the changes adopted in the UAAP calendar.

The national championship returned in 2017 and adopted an elite-eight tournament format. The top two teams from UAAP and NCAA, together with the CESAFI champion were seeded automatically. The three remaining slots were given to the champions of the Luzon, NCR and Mindanao regional tournaments.

In 2018, changes in the tournament format were made to give provincial teams a fair chance to be in the championship round. The champions of UAAP and NCAA were placed in a separate group while the rest of the qualified teams, including the CESAFI champion will be placed in a separate tournament group that will first determine the champions for North Luzon, South Luzon, Visayas and Mindanao. The eventual winner of this group will face-off with the winner of the UAAP/NCAA group to determine the national champion.

From 2017 to 2018, the PCCL held its 3x3 basketball tournament, in parallel to its regular national championship. The PCCL's version of its 3x3 tournament has similar rules with the BIG3 tournament. Regional 3x3 tournaments were held in North and South Luzon, Visayas and Mindanao. In 2018, the official FIBA 3x3 rules were followed.

Tournament results

5-on-5

Per tournament

Medal table

Per league

UAAP — 13
NCAA — 4

Regional champions

3x3

Results from 2004 to 2007

2004–05 CCL
The third season of the CCL began on February 11, 2005, with Philippine Basketball League's Chino Trinidad as the Commissioner.

Participating teams

Bracket

2006–07 CCL
The 4th Collegiate Champions League began on October 5, 2006

Participating teams

Bracket

Visayas–Mindanao qualifying series
All games were held at the Cebu Coliseum in Cebu City.

2007–08 CCL
The 5th Collegiate Champions League started on November 10, 2007.

Participating teams

Bracket

Media 
National Broadcasting Network (2002-2003)
Solar Sports (2004–2008)
ABS-CBN Sports (2009–2015)
Studio 23 (2009–2013)
ABS-CBN Sports and Action (2014–2015)
Basketball TV (2017)
ESPN 5 (5 Plus) (2018)
Livestreaming through PCCL's official Facebook and YouTube accounts (2019–present)

Notes

See also
College basketball in the Philippines
List of Philippine men's collegiate basketball champions
National Students' Basketball Championship, similar tournament held by the Basketball Association of the Philippines

References

External links

Samahang Basketbol ng Pilipinas
Philippine Collegiate Championship

 
Sports leagues established in 2002
 
2002 establishments in the Philippines